Tortriculladia mignonette is a moth in the family Crambidae. It was described by Harrison Gray Dyar Jr. in 1914. It is found in French Guiana.

References

Crambini
Moths described in 1914
Moths of South America